The Relentless Four or I quattro inesorabili is a 1965 Italian Spaghetti Western film in Eastmancolor directed by Primo Zeglio.

Synopsis
A Texas Ranger is framed by the four outlaws he is chasing for a crime he did not commit.

Cast
 Adam West as Ranger Sam Garrett
 Robert Hundar as Alan
 Red Ross as Troy
 Ralph Baldwyn as Moss
 János Barta as Rancher John
 José Jaspe as Implacable
 Roberto Camardiel as Jeffrey Anders
 Dina Loy as Eliza Anders / Susan Terry
 Cris Huerta as Comisario
 Elisa Mainardi as Nancy
 Luis Induni as Sheriff Luke
 Francisco Sanz as Doctor
 Robert Johnson Jr. as Bobi Calhoun
 Pauline Baards as Lucy Anders / Sra. Terry

References

External links
 
 

1965 films
1960s Italian-language films
Spaghetti Western films
1965 Western (genre) films
Films directed by Primo Zeglio
Films shot in Almería
Films scored by Marcello Giombini
Films scored by Franco Pisano
Films produced by Ricardo Sanz
1960s Italian films